Edgar Harold Hoppen (17 March 1918 – 5 July 1990) was an Australian rules footballer who played with St Kilda in the Victorian Football League (VFL).

Family
The son of Alexander Hoppen (1884–1957), and Sydney Daisy Hoppen (1887–1940), née Abbott, Edgar Harold Hoppen was born at Geelong, Victoria on 17 March 1918.

He married Joan Marie Morgan (1923–1989), in Sydney, on 1 September 1948.

Football

St Kilda (VFL)
He played 41 games with St Kilda over three seasons (1939–1941).

North Shore (SFL)
He played with the North Shore Football Club in the Sydney Football League for three seasons: 1946–1948.

NSW Representative
In his three seasons with North Shore he also played in 14 representative matches for New South Wales.

Notes

References
 
 World War Two Nominal Roll: Warrant Officer Class 2 Edgar Harold Hoppen (3552/VX85081), Department of Veterans' Affairs.

External links 
 
 

1918 births
1990 deaths
Australian rules footballers from Victoria (Australia)
St Kilda Football Club players
North Shore Australian Football Club players
Australian Army personnel of World War II
Australian Army soldiers